The following is a sortable list of compositions by Edvard Grieg (1843–1907).  The works are categorized by genre, catalogue number, date of composition and titles.

Catalogue numbers (Cat. No.) of compositions by Edvard Grieg include, according to the catalogue compiled by Dan Fog and the Edvard Grieg Committee:
 Opus numbers (Op.) 1–74
 EG numbers (EG) 101–181, for works with no assigned opus number

References 

 
Lists of compositions by composer